was a member of the Japanese Communist Party and former member of the House of Councillors. She was educated at Gunma University. In 1989, she was elected to the House of Councillors, and she took office in 1990.

Hayashi died on 25 January 2022 from amyotrophic lateral sclerosis.

References

1940 births
2022 deaths
20th-century Japanese women politicians
20th-century Japanese politicians
Japanese communists
Japanese Communist Party politicians
Members of the House of Councillors (Japan)
Deaths from motor neuron disease